Khwaja Nizam-ud-Din Ahmad Bakshi (also spelled as Nizam ad-Din Ahmad and Nizam al-Din Ahmad) (born 1551, died 1621/1030 AH) was a Muslim historian of late medieval India. He was son of Muhammad Muqim-i-Harawi. He was Akbar's Mir Bakhshi. His work, the Tabaqat-i-Akbari, is a comprehensive work on general history covering the time from the Ghaznavids (986-7) up to the 38th year of Akbar's reign (1593-4/1002 AH). The author quoted twenty-nine authorities in his work, some of which are entirely lost to us now.

See also
Muntakhab al-Tawarikh

Notes

References
 Brajendranath De;  Baini Prashad (eds.) The Ṭabaqāt-i-Akbarī of K̲h̲wājah Nizāmuddīn Ahmad : a history of India from the early Musalman invasions to the thirty-sixth year of the reign of Akbar by Niẓām al-Dīn Aḥmad ibn Muḥammad Muqīm; Calcutta : Asiatic Society, 1927, 1973 (3 vols.)
 Nizamuddin Ahmad, Khwajah. The ṭabaqāt-i-Akbarī. Edited by Brajendranath De and M. Hidayat Hosein. 3 vols. Calcutta: Bibliotheca Indica, 1931–35. Translated by B. De. 3 vols. Calcutta: Bibliotheca Indica, 1927–39.

External links

 Tabakāt Akbarī, a translation from Volume V of The History of India, as Told by Its Own Historians, 1867

1621 deaths
16th-century Indian historians
17th-century Indian historians
Historians from the Mughal Empire
1551 births
Akbar